Zhang Wei (Chinese: 张卫; born 28 March 1993 in Yucheng) is a Chinese football player who currently plays for Chinese Super League side Tianjin Jinmen Tiger, on loan from Shanghai SIPG.

Club career
Zhang started his professional football career in 2011 when he was loaned to Shanghai Zobon's squad from Shanghai Dongya for the 2011 China League Two campaign. He returned to Shanghai Dongya at the start of the new 2013 Chinese Super League season, with the club having recently been promoted to the top tier. He made his league debut for Shanghai on 4 May 2014 in a 2–2 away draw against Guangzhou R&F, coming on as a substitute for Wu Lei in the 90th minute. On 26 April 2017, he scored his first senior goal in a 2017 AFC Champions League match against FC Seoul, which ensured Shanghai's 4–2 home victory.

Career statistics 
Statistics accurate as of match played 17 November 2022.

Honours

Club
Shanghai SIPG
Chinese Super League: 2018

References

External links
 

1993 births
Living people
Chinese footballers
People from Shangqiu
Footballers from Henan
Pudong Zobon players
Shanghai Port F.C. players
China League Two players
Chinese Super League players
Association football defenders